The 2005 BC Lions finished in first place in the West Division with a 12–6 record. They appeared in the West Final.

Offseason

CFL Draft

Preseason

Regular season

Season standings

Season schedule

Player stats

Passing

Rushing

Receiving

Awards and records
 Brent Johnson (DE), – CFL's Most Outstanding Canadian Award

2005 CFL All-Stars
 Brent Johnson, Defensive End

Western Division All-Star Selections
 Ryan Thelwell, Wide Receiver
 Otis Floyd, Linebacker
 Brent Johnson, Defensive End
 Barron Miles, Safety

Playoffs

Scotiabank West Championship

VANCOUVER – On the heels of his benching against Calgary, it seemed likely that Edmonton head coach Danny Maciocia would leave Ricky Ray as the backup for the West final against the BC Lions. However, Maciocia said mid-week that Ray would start, leaving Jason Maas remaining as the backup. In BC, Dave Dickenson unsurprisingly got the start over former Most Outstanding Player Casey Printers, leading some to joke that four of the CFL's best quarterbacks would be in this game.

References

BC Lions seasons
Bc Lions Season, 2005
2005 in British Columbia